List of radio stations in Washington may refer to:

 List of radio stations in Washington (state)
 List of radio stations in Washington, D.C.